This is a list of places in Ukraine which have standing links to local communities in other countries known as "town twinning" (usually in Europe) or "sister cities" (usually in the rest of the world).

A
Alchevsk

 Dąbrowa Górnicza, Poland
 Dunaújváros, Hungary
 Feodosia, Ukraine
 Torez, Ukraine

Alushta

 Äänekoski, Finland
 Angarsk, Russia
 Capri, Italy
 Cassis, France
 Dubna, Russia
 Feodosia, Ukraine
 Georgiyevsk, Russia
 Krasnodon, Ukraine
 Ladushkin, Russia
 Nerekhtsky District, Russia
 Pesterzsébet (Budapest), Hungary
 Santa Cruz, United States
 Sozopol, Bulgaria
 Tambov, Russia

B
Berdyansk

 Beibei (Chongqing), China
 Bielsko-Biała, Poland
 Glyfada, Greece
 Haisyn, Ukraine
 Horodenka, Ukraine
 Khmilnyk, Ukraine
 Kremenchuk, Ukraine
 Lowell, United States
 Poti, Georgia
 La Seyne-sur-Mer, France
 Yambol, Bulgaria

Berdychiv

 Alytus, Lithuania
 Jawor, Poland
 Siedlce, Poland

Berehove

 Budapest, Hungary
 Dunajská Streda, Slovakia
 Ferencváros (Budapest), Hungary
 Hajdúböszörmény, Hungary
 Hatvan, Hungary
 Kecskemét, Hungary
 Kráľovský Chlmec, Slovakia
 Maassluis, Netherlands
 Mosonmagyaróvár, Hungary
 Odorheiu Secuiesc, Romania
 Przeworsk, Poland
 Sárrétudvari, Hungary
 Satu Mare, Romania
 Tiszaújváros, Hungary
 Vásárosnamény, Hungary
 Zalaegerszeg, Hungary

Bila Tserkva

 Barysaw, Belarus
 Bijelo Polje, Montenegro
 Itea, Greece
 Jingzhou, China
 Kremenchuk, Ukraine
 Ostrowiec Świętokrzyski, Poland
 Púchov, Slovakia
 Senaki, Georgia
 Solomianskyi (Kyiv), Ukraine
 Tarnów, Poland

Boryslav

 Dydnia, Poland
 Jeżowe, Poland
 Sanok (rural gmina), Poland

 Wałbrzych, Poland
 Zarszyn, Poland

Boryspil

 Callao, Peru
 Hopkins, United States

Boyarka

 Bziny, Slovakia
 Martvili, Georgia
 Nyasvizh, Belarus
 Ozurgeti, Georgia
 Puławy, Poland

Brody

 Bełżyce, Poland
 Mogilno, Poland
 Šaštín-Stráže, Slovakia
 Strzyżów County, Poland
 Żychlin, Poland

Brovary

 Fontenay-sous-Bois, France
 Gniezno County, Poland
 Grodzisk Wielkopolski County, Poland
 Kraśnik County, Poland
 Rockford, United States
 Santa Marinella, Italy
 Sillamäe, Estonia
 Tonalá, Mexico

Bucha

 Bilhorod-Dnistrovskyi, Ukraine
 Bucsa, Hungary

 Kovel, Ukraine
 Ospedaletto Euganeo, Italy
 Palanga, Lithuania
 Pont-de-Chéruy, France
 Tiachiv, Ukraine
 Tuszyn, Poland

C
Cherkasy

 Bydgoszcz, Poland

 Kuşadası, Turkey
 Madaba, Jordan
 Mazyr District, Belarus
 Orsha, Belarus
 Petah Tikva, Israel
 Rustavi, Georgia
 Sumgait, Azerbaijan
 Valmiera, Latvia
 Wanzhou (Chongqing), China

Chernihiv

 Gabrovo, Bulgaria
 Gomel, Belarus
 Hradec Králové, Czech Republic
 Memmingen, Germany
 Ogre, Latvia
 Petah Tikva, Israel
 Prilep, North Macedonia
 Rzeszów, Poland
 Tarnobrzeg, Poland

Chernivtsi

 Bălți, Moldova
 Chișinău, Moldova
 Iași, Romania
 Klagenfurt, Austria
 Konin, Poland
 Nof HaGalil, Israel
 Pleven, Bulgaria
 Salt Lake City, United States
 Saskatoon, Canada
 Suceava, Romania
 Timișoara, Romania

Chervonohrad
 Pyskowice, Poland

Chop

 Bicske, Hungary
 Čierna nad Tisou, Slovakia
 Milove, Ukraine
 Sokołów Małopolski, Poland
 Záhony, Hungary

Chornomorsk

 Beyoğlu, Turkey
 Haikou, China
 Maardu, Estonia
 Municipio XV (Rome), Italy
 Poti, Georgia
 Sinaia, Romania
 Tczew, Poland

Chortkiv

 Dobrodzień, Poland
 Korczyna, Poland
 Leżajsk, Poland
 Zawadzkie, Poland

Chuhuiv

 Kozienice, Poland
 Stary Sącz, Poland

D
Dnipro

 Durham, Canada
 Gomel, Belarus
 Herzliya, Israel
 Kutaisi, Georgia
 Szczecin, Poland
 Tashkent, Uzbekistan
 Vilnius, Lithuania
 Xi'an, China
 Žilina, Slovakia

Dolyna

 Grodzisk Wielkopolski, Poland
 Niemodlin, Poland
 Nowa Sarzyna, Poland
 Orhei, Moldova
 Prairie Village, United States
 Rubizhne, Ukraine
 Zviahel, Ukraine

Donetsk

 Batumi, Georgia
 Bochum, Germany
 Charleroi, Belgium
 Gomel, Belarus
 Katowice, Poland
 Kazan, Russia
 Kursk, Russia

 Narva, Estonia

 Pittsburgh, United States
 Samsun, Turkey
 Sheffield, England, United Kingdom
 Taiyuan, China
 Taranto, Italy
 Ulan-Ude, Russia
 Vilnius, Lithuania

Drohobych

 Buffalo, United States
 Bytom, Poland
 Dęblin, Poland
 Legnica, Poland
 Lipik, Croatia
 Muscatine, United States
 Nielisz, Poland
 Olecko, Poland
 Ostrzeszów County, Poland
 Przemyśl, Poland
 Sanok, Poland
 Smiltene, Latvia

Dubno

 Belogradchik, Bulgaria
 Czerwionka-Leszczyny, Poland
 Giżycko, Poland
 Sokołów Podlaski, Poland
 Uničov, Czech Republic

Dunaivtsi

 Brandýs nad Labem-Stará Boleslav, Czech Republic
 Turek, Poland

F
Feodosia

 Alchevsk, Ukraine
 Alushta, Ukraine
 Armavir, Armenia
 Armavir, Russia
 Azov, Russia
 Eastern AO (Moscow), Russia
 Kalofer (Karlovo), Bulgaria
 Kołobrzeg, Poland
 Kronstadt, Russia
 Kursk, Russia
 Samara, Russia
 Shchyolkovo, Russia
 Tver, Russia
 Ulyanovsk, Russia

H
Hola Prystan

 Cisnădie, Romania
 Hnivan, Ukraine
 Kaišiadorys, Lithuania
 Pinsk, Belarus
 Rîbnița, Moldova

Horishni Plavni

 Ungheni, Moldova
 Zhodzina, Belarus

Horlivka

 Barnsley, England, United Kingdom
 Buffalo, United States
 Pensacola, United States

I
Ivano-Frankivsk

 Arlington County, United States
 Braga, Portugal
 Brest, Belarus
 Chrzanów, Poland
 Chrzanów County, Poland
 Jelgava, Latvia
 Koszalin, Poland
 Lublin, Poland
 Nanning, China
 Nowa Sól County, Poland
 Ochota (Warsaw), Poland
 Opole, Poland
 Přerov, Czech Republic
 Rustavi, Georgia
 Rybnik, Poland
 Rzeszów, Poland
 Strășeni District, Moldova
 Świdnica, Poland
 Tomaszów Mazowiecki, Poland
 Trakai, Lithuania
 Zielona Góra, Poland

Iziaslav

 Brembate di Sopra, Italy
 Lovech, Bulgaria
 Ostrów Mazowiecka, Poland

Izium

 Andrychów, Poland
 Khoni, Georgia
 Tukums, Latvia

K
Kamianets-Podilskyi

 Athens, United States
 Brantford, Canada
 Częstochowa, Poland
 Dolný Kubín, Slovakia
 Edineț, Moldova
 Herrljunga, Sweden
 Głogów, Poland
 Gorzyce, Poland
 Kalisz, Poland

 Kutná Hora, Czech Republic
 Polotsk, Belarus
 Ponte Lambro, Italy
 Przemyśl, Poland
 Radoviš, North Macedonia
 Sanok, Poland
 Sanok County, Poland

 Targówek (Warsaw), Poland
 Teruel, Spain
 Ukmergė, Lithuania
 Zalău, Romania
 Zawiercie, Poland

Kaniv

 Chełmno, Poland
 Człuchów, Poland
 Kobryn, Belarus
 Sonoma, United States
 Viersen, Germany
 Võru, Estonia
 Vyshhorod, Ukraine

Kerch

 Çanakkale, Turkey
 Mogilev, Belarus
 Smolensk, Russia
 Temryuksky District, Russia
 Tula, Russia

Kharkiv

 Bologna, Italy
 Brno, Czech Republic
 Cetinje, Montenegro
 Cincinnati, United States
 Daugavpils, Latvia
 Gaziantep, Turkey
 Geroskipou, Cyprus
 Jinan, China
 Kaunas, Lithuania
 Kutaisi, Georgia
 Lille, France
 Maribor, Slovenia
 Nuremberg, Germany
 Polis, Cyprus
 Poznań, Poland
 Rishon LeZion, Israel
 Tianjin, China
 Tirana, Albania
 Trnava, Slovakia
 Varna, Bulgaria

Kherson

 Bizerte, Tunisia

 İzmit, Turkey
 Mersin, Turkey
 Shumen, Bulgaria
 Zalaegerszeg, Hungary
 Zonguldak, Turkey

Khmelnytskyi

 Bălți, Moldova
 Bor, Serbia
 Ciechanów, Poland
 Kramfors, Sweden
 Manises, Spain
 Modesto, United States
 Prague 6 (Prague), Czech Republic
 Šiauliai, Lithuania
 Silistra, Bulgaria
 Starobilsk, Ukraine

Khmilnyk

 Bagnoles-de-l'Orne-Normandie, France
 Berdyansk, Ukraine
 Busko-Zdrój, Poland
 Cupcini, Moldova
 Krynica-Zdrój, Poland
 Myrhorod, Ukraine
 Szczawnica, Poland

Khodoriv

 Ratne, Ukraine
 Strawczyn, Poland

Khust

 Komárom, Hungary
 Lesko, Poland
 Lipany, Slovakia
 Nyírbátor, Hungary
 Sighetu Marmației, Romania
 Snina, Slovakia
 Szirmabesenyő, Hungary
 Žďár nad Sázavou, Czech Republic

Kobeliaky
 Singen, Germany

Kolomyia

 Drochia, Moldova
 Gniewino, Poland
 Kratovo, North Macedonia
 Łapsze Niżne, Poland
 Łomża, Poland
 Nysa, Poland

 Sighetu Marmației, Romania

Korosten

 Anenii Noi, Moldova
 Kraśnik, Poland
 Mazyr, Belarus
 Noyabrsk, Russia
 Salekhard, Russia
 Sloviansk, Ukraine
 Svitlovodsk, Ukraine
 Volodymyr, Ukraine

Korsun-Shevchenkivskyi

 Chojnice, Poland
 Gifhorn, Germany

Kostopil

 Dobre Miasto, Poland
 Janów Lubelski, Poland
 Lubomino, Poland

Kovel

 Baboszewo, Poland
 Barsinghausen, Germany
 Brzeg Dolny, Poland
 Bucha, Ukraine
 Chamblee, United States
 Chełm, Poland
 Łęczna, Poland
 Legionowo, Poland
 Nikolske, Ukraine
 Pinsk, Belarus
 Smila, Ukraine
 Szczuczyn, Poland
 Utena, Lithuania
 Walsrode, Germany

Kremenchuk

 Alytus, Lithuania
 Berdyansk, Ukraine
 Bila Tserkva, Ukraine
 Bydgoszcz, Poland
 Jiayuguan, China
 Sidoarjo, Indonesia
 Svishtov, Bulgaria

Kryvyi Rih
 Rustavi, Georgia

Kyiv

 Ankara, Turkey
 Ashgabat, Turkmenistan
 Astana, Kazakhstan
 Athens, Greece
 Baku, Azerbaijan
 Beijing, China
 Bishkek, Kyrgyzstan
 Brasília, Brazil
 Bratislava, Slovakia
 Brussels, Belgium
 Bucharest, Romania
 Buenos Aires, Argentina
 Chicago, United States
 Chişinău, Moldova
 Edinburgh, Scotland, United Kingdom
 Florence, Italy
 Havana, Cuba
 Jakarta, Indonesia
 Kraków, Poland
 Kyoto, Japan
 Leipzig, Germany
 Lima, Peru
 Mexico City, Mexico
 Munich, Germany
 Odense, Denmark
 Osh Region, Kyrgyzstan
 Pretoria, South Africa
 Riga, Latvia
 Rio de Janeiro, Brazil
 Santiago, Chile
 Sofia, Bulgaria
 Tallinn, Estonia
 Tampere, Finland
 Tashkent, Uzbekistan
 Tbilisi, Georgia
 Toulouse, France
 Vilnius, Lithuania
 Warsaw, Poland
 Wuhan, China

L
Luhansk

 Cardiff, Wales, United Kingdom

 Lublin, Poland
 Pernik, Bulgaria
 Saint-Étienne, France
 Székesfehérvár, Hungary
 Yalta, Ukraine

Lutsk

 Bandırma, Turkey
 Białystok, Poland
 Brest, Belarus
 Chełm, Poland
 Kaunas, Lithuania
 Kyjov, Czech Republic
 Lippe (district), Germany
 Lublin, Poland
 Olsztyn, Poland
 Rzeszów, Poland
 Toruń, Poland
 Trakai, Lithuania
 Xiangtan, China
 Zamość, Poland

Lviv

 Banja Luka, Bosnia and Herzegovina
 Corning, United States
 Freiburg im Breisgau, Germany
 Kraków, Poland
 Kutaisi, Georgia
 Łódź, Poland
 Lublin, Poland
 Plovdiv, Bulgaria
 Przemyśl, Poland
 Rochdale, England, United Kingdom
 Rzeszów, Poland
 Winnipeg, Canada
 Wrocław, Poland

M
Makariv
 Popovo, Bulgaria

Mariupol

 Akmenė, Lithuania
 Kalymnos, Greece
 Pereiaslav, Ukraine
 Qiqihar, China
 Savona, Italy

Melitopol

 Barysaw, Belarus
 Brive-la-Gaillarde, France
 Gori, Georgia
 Kėdainiai, Lithuania
 Puchavičy District, Belarus
 Sliven, Bulgaria

Mohyliv-Podilskyi

 Bălți, Moldova
 Cavriglia, Italy
 Końskie, Poland

 Šaľa, Slovakia
 Środa Wielkopolska, Poland

Mukachevo

 Budavár (Budapest), Hungary
 Celldömölk, Hungary
 Dabas, Hungary
 Eger, Hungary
 Humenné, Slovakia
 Kisvárda, Hungary
 Mátészalka, Hungary
 Nyírmeggyes, Hungary
 Mielec, Poland
 Pag, Croatia
 Pelhřimov, Czech Republic
 Prešov, Slovakia
 Senta, Serbia

Mykolaiv

 Braslaw, Belarus
 Dezhou, China
 Galați, Romania
 Kutaisi, Georgia
 Mogilev, Belarus
 Nilüfer, Turkey
 Tinos, Greece
 Trieste, Italy
 Zhoushan, China

Myrhorod

 Anykščiai, Lithuania
 Barby, Germany
 Gorna Oryahovitsa, Bulgaria
 Jēkabpils, Latvia
 Khmilnyk, Ukraine
 Maardu, Estonia
 Mtskheta, Georgia
 Obukhiv, Ukraine
 Rechytsa, Belarus
 Smalyavichy, Belarus
 Zgorzelec, Poland
 Zviahel, Ukraine

N
Nadvirna

 Krnov, Czech Republic
 Prudnik, Poland
 Șomcuta Mare, Romania

Nizhyn

 Ioannina, Greece
 Preiļi, Latvia
 Świdnica, Poland

Novovolynsk

 Biłgoraj, Poland
 Bílina, Czech Republic
 Hrubieszów County, Poland
 Jaraczewo, Poland
 Kelmė, Lithuania
 Otwock County, Poland
 Rymanów, Poland

O
Obukhiv

 Będzin, Poland
 Myrhorod, Ukraine
 Polotsk, Belarus
 Radebeul, Germany

Odesa

 Alexandria, Egypt
 Baltimore, United States
 Chişinău, Moldova
 Constanţa, Romania
 Genoa, Italy
 Haifa, Israel
 Istanbul, Turkey
 Kolkata, India
 Liverpool, England, United Kingdom
 Łódź, Poland
 Marseille, France
 Nicosia, Cyprus
 Oulu, Finland
 Piraeus, Greece
 Qingdao, China
 Regensburg, Germany
 Split, Croatia
 Szeged, Hungary
 Vancouver, Canada
 Varna, Bulgaria
 Yerevan, Armenia
 Yokohama, Japan

Oleksandriia

 Jarocin, Poland
 Mazyr, Belarus
 Tervel, Bulgaria
 Xinyi, China

Ostroh

 Bieruń, Poland
 Moravský Beroun, Czech Republic
 Sandomierz, Poland

Ovruch

 Baranivka, Ukraine
 Choszczno, Poland
 Mazyr, Belarus

P
Pavlohrad

 Gori, Georgia
 Lubsko, Poland

Perechyn

 Drienica, Slovakia
 Głogów Małopolski, Poland
 Humenné, Slovakia
 Koromľa, Slovakia
 Kriva Palanka, North Macedonia
 Leżajsk (rural gmina), Poland

 Nagyecsed, Hungary
 Ruski Krstur (Kula), Serbia
 Sobrance, Slovakia
 Spišské Podhradie, Slovakia
 Svitavy, Czech Republic

Pereiaslav

 Kočani, North Macedonia
 Mariupol, Ukraine
 Mtskheta, Georgia
 Paide, Estonia
 Vileyka, Belarus

Peremyshliany

 Łosice, Poland
 Skawina, Poland

Pidhaitsi
 Strzegom, Poland

Poltava

 Baranavichy, Belarus
 Borjomi, Georgia
 Dongying, China
 Filderstadt, Germany
 Flint, United States
 Irondequoit, United States
 Leinfelden-Echterdingen, Germany
 Ostfildern, Germany
 Qinhuai (Nanjing), China

R
Radomyshl
 Radomyśl Wielki, Poland

Rakhiv

 Belváros-Lipótváros (Budapest), Hungary
 Bielsk Podlaski, Poland
 Deszk, Hungary
 Poienile de sub Munte, Romania
 Svidník, Slovakia
 Szeged, Hungary
 Třebíč, Czech Republic

Rivne

 Kobuleti, Georgia
 Lublin, Poland
 Piotrków Trybunalski, Poland
 Radomsko County, Poland
 Sievierodonetsk, Ukraine
 Vidin, Bulgaria
 Zabrze, Poland
 Zvolen, Slovakia

Rubizhne

 Dolyna, Ukraine
 Rossosh, Russia

S
Saky

 Aleksin, Russia
 Centralny (Gomel), Belarus
 Fethiye, Turkey
 Livny, Russia
 Qionghai, China
 Shchigry, Russia
 Sudak, Ukraine
 Vadul lui Vodă, Moldova
 Yessentuki, Russia

Sarny

 Długołęka, Poland
 Nowy Dwór Gdański, Poland

Shchyrets

 Bełżyce, Poland
 Gudensberg, Germany
 Jelcz-Laskowice, Poland
 Kamienna Góra, Poland

Shepetivka
 Łowicz, Poland

Shostka

 Akmenė, Lithuania
 Oryahovo, Bulgaria
 Słubice, Poland
 Świdnik, Poland

Shumsk

 Kobyłka, Poland
 Mszczonów, Poland

Simferopol

 Alexandroupoli, Greece
 Heidelberg, Germany

Skadovsk

 Novopolotsk, Belarus
 Šilutė, Lithuania
 Zolochiv, Ukraine

Slavutych

 Aizkraukle, Latvia

 Kalinkavichy, Belarus
 Visaginas, Lithuania

Sniatyn

 Koniecpol, Poland
 Krasnohorivka, Ukraine

Stryi

 Bălți, Moldova
 Düren, Germany
 Gradačac, Bosnia and Herzegovina
 Lwówek County, Poland
 Mansfield, England, United Kingdom
 Nowy Sącz, Poland
 Vegreville, Canada
 Zakopane, Poland

Sudak

 Beryozovsky, Russia
 Dolinsk, Russia
 Kotelniki, Russia
 Kyivskyi (Donetsk), Ukraine
 Perovo (Moscow), Russia
 Saky, Ukraine
 Volokolamsk, Russia

Sumy

 Celle, Germany
 Gorzów Wielkopolski, Poland
 Kutaisi, Georgia
 Lublin, Poland
 Vratsa, Bulgaria
 Zhuji, China

T
Ternopil

 Batumi, Georgia
 Chorzów, Poland
 Elbląg, Poland
 Nysa, Poland
 Pinsk, Belarus
 Płońsk, Poland
 Prudentópolis, Brazil
 Sliven, Bulgaria
 Sulęcin County, Poland
 Tarnów, Poland
 Tauragė, Lithuania
 Tiraspol, Moldova
 Viljandi, Estonia

Tetiiv
 Żory, Poland

Tiachiv

 Baktalórántháza, Hungary
 Balmazújváros, Hungary
 Bardejov, Slovakia
 Bucha, Ukraine
 Chotěboř, Czech Republic
 Jablunkov, Czech Republic
 Jászberény, Hungary
 Náchod, Czech Republic
 Nagykálló, Hungary
 Negrești-Oaș, Romania
 Pestszentlőrinc-Pestszentimre (Budapest), Hungary
 Spišská Nová Ves, Slovakia
 Tuszyn, Poland
 Vác, Hungary

Torez

 Alchevsk, Ukraine
 Sallaumines, France
 Świętochłowice, Poland

Truskavets

 Annopol, Poland
 Dolný Kubín, Slovakia
 Działdowo, Poland
 Jasło, Poland
 Limanowa, Poland
 Przemyśl, Poland
 Rzeszów, Poland
 Sloviansk, Ukraine
 Tsqaltubo, Georgia
 Uniejów, Poland
 Wathlingen, Germany
 Zaklików, Poland

U
Uman

 Ashkelon, Israel
 Davis, United States
 Gniezno, Poland
 Haapsalu, Estonia
 Kórnik, Poland
 Łańcut, Poland
 Milford Haven, Wales, United Kingdom
 Nof HaGalil, Israel
 Radviliškis, Lithuania
 Romilly-sur-Seine, France
 Safed, Israel

Uzhhorod

 Békéscsaba, Hungary
 Česká Lípa, Czech Republic
 Corvallis, United States
 Darmstadt, Germany
 Jarosław, Poland
 Jihlava, Czech Republic
 Košice, Slovakia
 Krosno, Poland
 Michalovce, Slovakia
 Nyíregyháza, Hungary
 Požega, Croatia
 Pula, Croatia
 Szombathely, Hungary
 Trogir, Croatia
 Ulcinj, Montenegro
 Xinzhou, China

V
Vatutine

 Smila, Ukraine
 Valuyki, Russia

Vinnytsia

 Bat Yam, Israel
 Birmingham, United States
 Bursa, Turkey
 Kielce, Poland
 Panevėžys, Lithuania
 Peterborough, England, United Kingdom

Volodymyr

 Hrubieszów, Poland
 Kętrzyn, Poland
 Korosten, Ukraine
 Łęczyca, Poland
 Zwickau, Germany

Vynnyky

 Grudziądz, Poland
 Gurjaani, Georgia
 Milovice, Czech Republic
 Poręba, Poland
 Radzyń Chełmiński, Poland
 Trzebnica, Poland

Vynohradiv

 Dynów, Poland

 Nyírbátor, Hungary
 Vranov nad Topľou, Slovakia

Vyshhorod

 Belgorod, Russia
 Delčevo, North Macedonia
 Eichenau, Germany
 Kaniv, Ukraine
 Lörrach, Germany
 Rakvere, Estonia
 Sens, France
 Suzdal, Russia
 Wyszków, Poland

Y
Yalta

 Antalya, Turkey
 Baden-Baden, Germany
 Batumi, Georgia
 Eilat, Israel
 Grozny, Russia
 Kaluga, Russia
 Khachmaz, Azerbaijan
 Latakia, Syria
 Luhansk, Ukraine
 Margate, England, United Kingdom
 Nice, France
 Pozzuoli, Italy
 Rhodes, Greece
 Salsomaggiore Terme, Italy
 Sanya, China
 Sharm El Sheikh, Egypt
 Ulan-Ude, Russia
 Vladikavkaz, Russia

Yampil
 Soroca, Moldova

Yaremche
 Namysłów, Poland

Yavoriv

 Jarosław, Poland
 Lubaczów, Poland
 Węgorzewo, Poland

Yevpatoria

 Aleksin, Russia
 Belgorod, Russia
 Figueira da Foz, Portugal
 Ioannina, Greece
 Krasnogorsky District, Russia
 Ludwigsburg, Germany
 Nizhny Tagil, Russia
 Vologda, Russia
 Zakynthos, Greece

Yuzhne

 Dimitrovgrad, Bulgaria
 Kavarna, Bulgaria
 Kemer, Turkey
 Kobuleti, Georgia
 Körmend, Hungary
 Mogilev, Belarus
 Yueqing, China

Yuzhnoukrainsk
 Bełchatów, Poland

Z
Zaporizhia

 Ashdod, Israel
 Belfort, France
 Birmingham, England, United Kingdom
 Lahti, Finland
 Linz, Austria
 Magdeburg, Germany
 Oberhausen, Germany
 Yichang, China

Zavodske
 Krzeszów, Poland

Zhmerynka

 Sędziszów Małopolski, Poland
 Skarżysko-Kamienna, Poland

Zhovkva

 Cieszanów, Poland
 Horyniec-Zdrój, Poland
 Łaszczów, Poland
 Łęczna County, Poland
 Ludwin, Poland
 Mełgiew, Poland
 Piaski, Poland
 Rybczewice, Poland
 Spiczyn, Poland
 Wólka, Poland
 Zamość, Poland
 Żółkiewka, Poland

Zhytomyr

 Bytom, Poland

 Kutaisi, Georgia
 Montana, Bulgaria
 Płock, Poland
 Shangla, Pakistan

Zolochiv

 Oława, Poland
 Schöningen, Germany
 Skadovsk, Ukraine

Zviahel

 Bełchatów, Poland
 Dolyna, Ukraine
 Halych, Ukraine
 Khashuri, Georgia
 Łomża, Poland
 Myrhorod, Ukraine
 Rahachow, Belarus
 Šalčininkai, Lithuania
 Suomussalmi, Finland

References

Ukraine
Lists of populated places in Ukraine
Foreign relations of Ukraine
Cities in Ukraine